, alternately read Kinbu Shrine (Kinbu-jinja), Kinpō Shrine (Kinpō-jinja) or Kinbō Shrine (Kinbō-jinja) refers to a number of Shinto shrines in Japan.  They can refer to:

Kinpu Shrine (Yoshino) in Yoshino, Nara Prefecture
Kinpu Shrine (Nagaoka) in Nagaoka, Niigata Prefecture
Kinbu Shrine (Mino) in Mino, Gifu Prefecture
Kinpō Shrine (Nigaha) in Nigaha, Akita Prefecture
Kinpō Shrine (Tsuruoka) in Tsuruoka, Yamagata Prefecture
Kinpō Shrine (Minamisatsuma) in Minamisatsuma, Kagoshima Prefecture

ja:金峰神社